Dombühl station is a railway station in the municipality of Dombühl, located in the Ansbach district in Middle Franconia, Germany. The station is on the Nuremberg–Crailsheim line of Deutsche Bahn.

References

Nuremberg S-Bahn stations
Railway stations in Bavaria
Railway stations in Germany opened in 1875
1875 establishments in Bavaria
Buildings and structures in Ansbach (district)